Hayyim ben Solomon Tyrer was an important Hasidic rabbi and kabbalist, and is today remembered for several well known Hasidic works.  
He is also known as "Hayyim of Czernowitz", after his time there.

He was a pupil of Rabbi Yechiel Michl (the Maggid of Zlotshev), as well as of the Maggid of Mezritch; both in turn direct pupils of the Baal Shem Tov. After he had been rabbi at five different towns, among them Mogilev, Czernowitz and Botoșani, he settled in Jerusalem.
He died in Jerusalem in 1813, and was buried in a cave in the Jewish cemetery of Safed.

He was the author of: 
 Sidduro shel Shabbat, kabbalistic homilies on Shabbat-related subjects (Poryck, 1818)
 Be'er Mayim Ḥayyim, novellæ on the Pentateuch, in two parts (Czernowitz, pt. i. 1820, pt. ii. 1849)
 Sha'ar ha-Tefillah, kabbalistic reflections on prayer (Sudilkov, 1837)
 Ereẓ ha-Ḥayyim, in two parts: (1) a homiletic commentary on the Prophets and Hagiographa, and (2) novellæ on the tractate Berakhot (Czernowitz, 1861) 
He is mentioned by Rabbi Sender Margalioth in his responsa on  Shulchan Aruch, Even Ha'ezer.

References

External links
Be'er Mayim Chayim Rabbi Chaim Tirar of Tchernovitz - "The Well of Living Waters" at chabad.org
Yihudim in the thought of R. Hayyim Tyrer of Czernowitz at Google Books
The Be'er Mayim Chaim; shiurim by Rabbi Moshe Weinberger

Year of birth missing
1813 deaths
19th-century rabbis in Jerusalem
Authors of Hasidic works
Authors of Kabbalistic works
Belarusian Hasidic rabbis
Bible commentators
Hasidic rebbes
Hebrew-language writers
Kabbalists
Moldovan Orthodox rabbis
People from Botoșani
Clergy from Chernivtsi
People from Mogilev
18th-century rabbis in Jerusalem
Ukrainian Hasidic rabbis
18th-century rabbis from the Russian Empire
Writers from Chernivtsi